Coregonus restrictus is  an extinct freshwater fish from the family Salmonidae.  It was originally discovered in Lake Morat, Switzerland, in 1885. In 2008 it was included on the IUCN Red List by J. Freyhof and M. Kottelat. It was first described by Fatio.

References

restrictus